Mae West (also known as The Mae West Story) is a 1982 television film about the life of the comedian actress and writer Mae West. It was directed by Lee Philips, starring Ann Jillian as West and featuruing James Brolin, Piper Laurie, and Roddy McDowall in supporting roles.

Release and reception
The film originally aired on ABC on May 2, 1982, and was the third most-viewed prime time television program in the United States for the week of April 26–May 2, 1982. In 2010s, it was released digitally on platforms like Amazon Freevee and Google Play Movies.

At the 34th Primetime Emmy Awards, the film received four nominations: Outstanding Lead Actress in a Limited Series or a Special for Ann Jillian, Outstanding Directing in a Limited Series or a Special for Lee Philips, Outstanding Costume Design for a Special for Jean-Pierre Dorléac, and Outstanding Achievement in Makeup for Richard Blair. Jillian was also nominated to a Golden Globe for Best Actress in a Miniseries or Motion Picture Made for Television.

In a retrospective review, AllMovie rated the film 2.5 out of 5 stars.

Cast
Ann Jillian as Mae West
James Brolin as Jim Timony
Piper Laurie as Matilda West
Roddy McDowall as Rene Valentine 
Louis Giambalvo as George Kane
Chuck McCann as W. C. Fields
Lee de Broux as Jack West
Donald Hotton as Edward Eisner
Ian Wolfe as Dorset 
Bill Morey as Al Kaufman
Rita Taggart as Sally
Michael Currie as Bill Le Baron
Jay Garner as Archie Mayo
Burke Byrnes as Withers
Bridgette Andersen as Mae West (age 7)
Martin Azarow as Detective

References

External links

1982 television films
ABC network original films
American television films
Cultural depictions of Mae West
Films directed by Lee Philips
Films scored by Brad Fiedel
1980s English-language films